Fanie van der Merwe (born 25 February 1986) is a Paralympic athlete from South Africa competing mainly in category T37 sprint events.

He competed in the 2008 Summer Paralympics in Beijing, China. There he won a gold medal in the men's 100 metres – T37 event and a gold medal in the men's 200 metres – T37 event. He also competed in the 2012 Summer Paralympics in London where he defended his 100 m T37 gold medal.

References

External links 
 

1986 births
Living people
African Games gold medalists for South Africa
African Games medalists in athletics (track and field)
Athletes (track and field) at the 2008 Summer Paralympics
Athletes (track and field) at the 2011 All-Africa Games
Athletes (track and field) at the 2012 Summer Paralympics
Athletes (track and field) at the 2014 Commonwealth Games
Athletes (track and field) at the 2015 African Games
Athletes (track and field) at the 2016 Summer Paralympics
Commonwealth Games gold medallists for South Africa
Commonwealth Games medallists in athletics
Medalists at the 2008 Summer Paralympics
Medalists at the 2012 Summer Paralympics
Medalists at the 2016 Summer Paralympics
Paralympic athletes of South Africa
Paralympic gold medalists for South Africa
Recipients of the Order of Ikhamanga
World record holders in Paralympic athletics
Paralympic medalists in athletics (track and field)
South African male sprinters
20th-century South African people
21st-century South African people
Medallists at the 2014 Commonwealth Games